Carlos Alberto Ambriz Gómez (born February 14, 1994, in Morelia, Michoacán) is a professional Mexican footballer.

References

External links

Carlos Ambriz at Depor:Sport boys 

1994 births
Living people
Association football defenders
Atlético Morelia players
C.D. Tepatitlán de Morelos players
Atlético San Luis footballers
Atlético Estado de México players
Monarcas Morelia Premier players
Sport Boys footballers
Liga Premier de México players
Tercera División de México players
Peruvian Primera División players
Peruvian Segunda División players
Mexican expatriate footballers
Mexican expatriate sportspeople in Peru
Expatriate footballers in Peru
Footballers from Michoacán
Mexican footballers
Sportspeople from Morelia